Propaganda is a form of communication that is aimed at influencing the attitude of a community toward some cause or position.

Propaganda may also refer to:

Books and magazines
Propaganda (book), a 1928 book by Edward Bernays
Propaganda (fanzine), a Finnish punk subculture fanzine founded in 1979, reissued, as well digitally 2015
Propaganda: The Formation of Men's Attitudes, a 1965 book by Jacques Ellul
Propaganda, The Game, a part of the set of Academic Games developed by Professors Robert and Layman Allen
Propaganda (magazine), a former magazine about Goth subculture, issued since 1982 until 2002

Music

Record labels
Propaganda (label), a Finnish record label, founded in 1981
Propaganda Records, a Finnish record company, founded in 1981

Artists
Propaganda (band), a German synthpop group, formed in 1982
Propaganda (Russian band), a Russian pop/synthpop band, formed in 2001
Propaganda (Yugoslav band), a Yugoslav new wave band, formed in 1981
Propaganda (musician), a Christian hip hop and spoken word artist and poet

Albums
Propaganda (Sparks album), 1974
Propaganda (The Sound album), 1999
Propaganda (Aftershock album), a 2001 compilation album 
Propaganda (Melotron album), 2007
Propaganda (Fred Frith album), 2015

Songs
"Propaganda", a song by Sepultura on their album Chaos A.D.
"Propaganda", a song by Briskeby
"Propaganda", a song from Absolute Design by Engel
"Propaganda", a song by Muse on their album Simulation Theory

Film 
Propaganda (1999 film), a Turkish comedy film by director Sinan Çetin
Propaganda (2012 film), a New Zealand mockumentary representing itself as a North Korean propaganda film.
Propaganda film, usually a documentary-style production or a fictional screenplay, that is produced to convince the viewer of a certain political point or influence the opinions or behavior of people, often by providing deliberately misleading, propagandistic content
Propaganda Films, a music video company

Other uses
 Sacra congregatio de propaganda fide, a former Latin name of the Congregation for the Evangelization of Peoples
Propaganda (desktop backgrounds), a collection of free desktop backgrounds
Propaganda Games, a former game development company based in Vancouver, British Columbia, Canada